Category Is Books is an independent bookshop in Glasgow, Scotland. It is the only LGBT+ bookshop in Scotland and one of only seven in the United Kingdom. It was established by Charlotte and Fionn Duffy-Scott in September 2018.

Every book stocked at the store is either written by someone from the LGBT+ community, contains at least one LGBT+ character or has an LGBT+ narrative.

History 
Category Is Books was launched with help from Gay's The Word, the first and only remaining LGBT+ bookshop in London.

The shop hosted many queer community events and a non-drinking space for the LGBT+ community. They host events such as yoga, queer tarot readings, and a transgender-friendly pop-up barbershop.

Community is an integral part of how the bookshop runs, with co-owner Duffy-Scott saying, "Community is important here and it’s a specifically queer space so a lot of the events have nothing to do with books."

The bookshop was visited by Nicola Sturgeon in November 2018.

The shop closed due to COVID-19 but offered deliveries by skateboard and bike.

Category Is has since reopened following the Covid-19 lockdowns of 2020-2021.

See also 
 Lavender Menace Bookshop
 List of LGBT bookstores

References 

2018 establishments in Scotland
Govanhill and Crosshill
Independent bookshops of the United Kingdom
LGBT bookstores
LGBT culture in Glasgow